Symphyotrichum falcatum (formerly Aster falcatus) is a species of flowering plant in the  family Asteraceae. Commonly called white prairie aster and western heath aster, it is native to a widespread area of central and western North America.

Description
White prairie aster blooms July–November depending on variety and location. It has hairy stems and hairy, grayish-green and firm entire leaves.

On the outside of the flower heads of all members of the family Asteraceae are small specialized leaves called "phyllaries", and together they form the involucre that protects the individual flowers in the head before they open. The outer phyllaries are spreading to reflexed (bent sharply backwards) and oblanceolate to spatulate in shape. The inner phyllaries are linear-lanceolate. They are in  unequal rows, meaning they are staggered and do not end at the same point.

These surround a center of roughly the same number of disk florets that start as yellow and become brown with age.

Chromosomes
Symphyotrichum falcatum has a base number of x = 5. Diploid, tetraploid, and hexaploid cytotypes with respective chromosome counts of 10, 20, and 30 have been reported, depending upon the infraspecies, as follows:

 S. spathulatum var. falcatum: 2n = 2x = 10, 2n = 4x = 20, and 2n = 6x = 30.
 S. spathulatum var. commutatum: 2n = 6x = 30.

Taxonomy
Symphyotrichum falcatum is one of the two species within Symphyotrichum sect. Ericoidei. The other is S. ericoides. The species was first formally described by John Lindley in 1834 as Aster falcatus.

Two varieties are recognized:
 S. falcatum var. falcatum, cespitose with up to ten stems from caudices, and known commonly as white prairie aster, western heath aster, creeping white prairie aster, falcate aster, and little grey aster.
 S. falcatum var. commutatum, communal with stems growing from rhizomes. Common names of this variety include white prairie aster, western heath aster, and little grey aster, as well as cluster aster.

S. falcatum is one of the parents of the two allopolyploidal Symphyotrichum species S. ascendens and S. defoliatum.

Distribution and habitat
S. falcatum var. falcatum is native from Alaska, Yukon, and Northwest Territories in the north, western Canada from British Columbia to Manitoba, in the United States from Idaho east to Minnesota, west to Wyoming and south to New Mexico and Arizona, then north to Utah. It is also native to northern Mexico.

S. falcatum var. commutatum has no subarctic presence, extends farther east into Ontario, the South Central and upper Midwestern United States, and farther south in Mexico.

Conservation
NatureServe lists it as Secure (G5) worldwide, Critically Imperiled (S1) in Alaska, Imperiled (S2) in Manitoba, Vulnerable (S3) in Yukon, and Possibly Extirpated (SH) in Iowa. It is an exotic species in Ontario, Missouri, and Massachusetts.

Uses
The Zuni people call S. falcatum var. commutatum by the name ha'mopiawe and mix the ground blossoms with yucca suds to wash newborn infants. Quoting American ethnologist Matilda Coxe Stevenson:The blossoms, ground to a fine meal, are sprinkled into a bowl of yucca suds used for bathing a new-born infant. This medicine is said to make the hair grow on the head and to give strength to the body. The remedy belongs to all women.

The Ramah Navajo use the plant in a decoction to make a lotion as a remedy for snake bites.

Notes

Citations

References

External links
Symphyotrichum falcatum in the CalPhotos photo database, University of California, Berkeley 

falcatum
Flora of Subarctic America
Flora of Canada
Flora of the North-Central United States
Flora of the South-Central United States
Flora of the Southwestern United States
Flora of the Northwestern United States
Plants used in traditional Native American medicine
Plants described in 1834
Taxa named by John Lindley